Hyalotephritis is a genus of tephritid  or fruit flies in the family Tephritidae.

Species
Hyalotephritis complanata (Munro, 1929)
Hyalotephritis planiscutellata (Becker, 1903)

References

Tephritinae
Tephritidae genera
Diptera of Asia
Diptera of Africa